Harrison School is a historic public school building for African-American students located at Roanoke, Virginia.  It was built in 1916, and is a three-story, brick public school building, with three-bay, two-story wings added in 1922.  The original section consists of a 13-bay rectangular block flanked by projecting wings, five bays on the sides.  The building symbolizes the pioneering efforts of Lucy Addison and other black educators in Southwest Virginia to offer academic secondary
instruction to all children regardless of race.

It was listed on the National Register of Historic Places in 1982.

References

African-American history of Virginia
School buildings on the National Register of Historic Places in Virginia
School buildings completed in 1916
Schools in Roanoke, Virginia
National Register of Historic Places in Roanoke, Virginia
1916 establishments in Virginia